Wolfgang Mückstein (born 5 July 1974 in Vienna) is an Austrian physician and politician. He served as Minister for Social Affairs, Health, Care and Consumer Protection in the governments of chancellors Sebastian Kurz, Alexander Schallenberg and Karl Nehammer from 19 April 2021 until 8 March 2022.

References

Living people
1974 births
Place of birth missing (living people)
21st-century Austrian politicians
Health ministers of Austria
The Greens – The Green Alternative politicians
20th-century Austrian physicians
21st-century Austrian physicians